The 1600s ran from January 1, 1600, to December 31, 1609.

References